The following is a list of administrative divisions of the Republic of China  (Taiwan), including 6 special municipalities and 2 nominal provinces as the de jure first-level administrative divisions. 11 counties and 3 cities were nominally under the jurisdiction of the Taiwan Province, and 2 additional counties being part of the ROC's Fujian Province.

With provinces non-functional in practice, Taiwan is divided into 22 subnational divisions, among which counties and cities are the de facto principle constituent divisions, along with special municipalities, directly under the Central Government. Each with a local government led by an elected head and a local council.

List

Map

See also
 Administrative divisions of Taiwan
 List of magistrates and mayors in Taiwan
 List of townships/cities and districts in Taiwan

Notes

References

External links 
 Taiwanese national bureau of statistics
 MOI Statistical information service

Subdivisions of Taiwan
Taiwan
Administrative divisions
Taiwan